Usworth railway station served the village of Usworth, Washington, England from 1864 to 1963 on the Leamside line.

History 
The station was opened in May 1864 by the North Eastern Railway. The station was situated south of the level crossing on Usworth Station Road and Washington Road. Goods traffic handled at the station included bricks, potatoes, gravel, sand and livestock. The train services slowly became less frequent with a significant reduction in service during the Second World War until the September 1953 timetable showed that no trains called as Usworth. The bookings at Usworth had declined to only 5,593 in 1951. From 14 September 1959 there were no staff at the station so the station was class as an unstaffed halt, although the halt suffix was not added to its name. The station was later closed due to the Beeching Report on 9 September 1963 to both passenger services and goods traffic. The station had been demolished by the 1970s.

References

External links 

Disused railway stations in Tyne and Wear
Former North Eastern Railway (UK) stations
Railway stations in Great Britain opened in 1864
Railway stations in Great Britain closed in 1963
1864 establishments in England
1963 disestablishments in England
Beeching closures in England